Chemokine (C-C motif) ligand 25 (CCL25) is a small cytokine belonging to the CC chemokine family that is also known as TECK (Thymus-Expressed Chemokine).  CCL25 is believed to play a role in the development of T-cells. It is chemotactic for thymocytes, macrophages, and dendritic cells. CCL25 elicits its effects by binding to the chemokine receptor CCR9.  Human CCL25 is produced as a protein precursor containing 151 amino acids.  The gene for CCL25 (scya25) is located on human chromosome 19.

References

Cytokines